Tilsit may refer to:
Tilsit, German name of the town of Sovetsk in Kaliningrad Oblast, Russia; in the former East Prussia
Tilsit Éditions, a French game publisher
Tilsit cheese, a light yellow semi-hard smear-ripened cheese
Treaties of Tilsit, two agreements signed by Napoleon I of France in 1807 in the aftermath of his victory at Friedland
Act of Tilsit, an act by Prussian Lithuanians signed in 1918
Tilsit, Missouri, a community in the United States